Warner's Filling Station and House, in Geneva, Nebraska, was listed on the National Register of Historic Places in 2006.  The listing included three buildings, located at 737 and 745 "G" St. in Geneva.

It has also been known as Eddie's "66" Service.  The filling station building is a one-story frame and stucco structure on a concrete slab and concrete fittings, built in a style similar to a bungalow house, including having bracketed overhanging eaves.  It has a gable roof and a canopy supported by two columns.

References

Gas stations on the National Register of Historic Places in Nebraska
National Register of Historic Places in Fillmore County, Nebraska
Buildings and structures completed in 1922